Tripeptidyl-peptidase 2 is an enzyme that in humans is encoded by the TPP2 gene. Among other things it is heavily implicated in MHC (HLA) class-I processing, as it has both endopeptidase and exopeptidase activity.

Clinical significance and genetic deficiency
Biallelic deleterious variants in the TPP2 gene may result in a recessive disorder with immune deficiency, autoimmune disease and intellectual disability. Some genetic variants may result in a milder disease with sterile brain inflammation mimicking multiple sclerosis. These observations underline the fundamental role of TPP2 in cells of the immune system.

References

External links 
 The MEROPS online database for peptidases and their inhibitors: S08.090

Further reading 

 
 
 
 
 
 
 
 
 
 
 
 
 
 

Proteases
EC 3.4.14